The Royal–Thomian (The Battle of the Blues) is an annual cricket match in Sri Lanka played between Royal College, Colombo and S. Thomas' College, Mount Lavinia since 1879. It is known as The Battle of the Blues due to the colours of the two school's flags i.e. blue, gold and blue of Royal College and blue, black and blue of S. Thomas' College.

History 
The original match was played between the Colombo Academy and S. Thomas' College, Mutwal in 1879, with schoolmasters and schoolboys participating. Mr. Ashley Walker captained the Colombo Academy while Rev. S. J. Meyrick, a member of the staff played for S. Thomas' College, Mutwal. This encounter is not considered the first match as Masters played for both sides.

In 1880, only the students took part and this first official encounter between the Colombo Academy and S. Thomas' College, Mutwal in Modara was played at Galle Face Grounds, which is today the site of the Taj Samudra Hotel. The match commenced at 4.00 p.m. each day. The Beira Lake stretched up to the present railway line close to San Sebastian Hill and the two teams rowed across in boats to the Galle Face Grounds. The Academy made 110 in the first inning; and St. Thomas' 59. In the second innings the Academy made 35 and St. Thomas' 24. J. W. de Silva was the Academy captain and F. W. McDonnell the Thomian captain. In this first encounter Colombo Academy won by 62 runs.

At present, the match is played between Royal College, Colombo which is a public non-denominational school accommodating approximately 8,500 students and S. Thomas' College, Mt Lavinia which is a private Anglican school that has about 2500 boys on roll and a branch network of three constituent colleges with a total of over 5,500 students. It was the first schoolboy cricket match in Sri Lanka to be played over three days.

The Royal-Thomian is the second-longest uninterrupted Cricket series in the entire world, preceded only by the Cricket Intercol played between Prince Alfred College, Adelaide and St. Peter's College, Adelaide, whose first match was played in 1878.

Shield 
This match is played for the prestigious D. S. Senanayake Memorial Shield. Incidentally, Rt. Hon. D. S. Senanayake, who became the first Prime Minister of Independent Ceylon, donned the Thomian cap in 1901 and 1902. This shield was first presented in 1928. If a match is drawn then the school already holding the shield retains it. Royal College is the current holder of the shield after winning the 144th Battle of the Blues in 2023.

Atmosphere 
The "Battle of the Blues" is filled with pageantry, with decorated tents, flags and baila singing and dancing groups present all around the city and the ground itself during the match days and in the days leading up to it. The match is held on a Thursday, Friday and Saturday. By tradition, the schools are closed on match days to allow students to attend the Big Match. Souvenirs published by both the schools are sold on all three days, the duty of distribution entrusted to the souvenir committees. On the day before the match, the students of each school take a walk around the city in a "cycle parade" with bands and decorations and other colourful items showing support for their team. Overloaded cars with supporters singing and careering along the Colombo streets is a familiar sight during match days.

The match is looked forward to by both the young and old, male and female, and even those who have no connection with either school turn up and enjoy the celebrations. It is more of an occasion for the old boys and present students of both schools coming together for three days of revelry. It is quite normal to see elderly alumni from either school coming to the "Big Match" to relive old times and meet old friends. Some expatriates choose this time of year to return to Sri Lanka in order to relive their old school days.

Venues
 Galle Face Grounds (Home of Colombo Cricket Club) - 1880, 1882 to 1891, 1893, 1894, 1897, 1899, 1912
 Gordon Gardens - 1881
 Nomads Cricket Club (NCC) Grounds, Victoria Park - 1892
 CCC Grounds, Maitland Crescent - 1895 to 1896, 1898, 1900 to 1911
 Campbell Park - 1913 to 1915, 1917
 NCC Grounds, Maitland Crescent - 1916, 1935, 1936, 1937, 1939, 1941
 Sinhalese Sports Club (SSC) Grounds, Victoria Park (current NCC grounds) - 1918 to 1934, 1938, 1940, 1942, 1944, 1946, 1948
 Colombo Oval - 1943, 1945, 1947, 1949 to 1974, 1977, 1978, 1980, 1983, 1984, 1986 to 1988, 1991, 1992, 1993
 SSC Grounds, Maitland Place - 1975, 1976, 1979, 1981, 1982, 1985, 1989, 1990, 1994 to Present

Notable people who have played in the Royal Thomian Cricket Match

Royalists 
 J.R. Jayawardene
 Sir John Lionel Kotalawela   
 Sir Forester Obeysekera
 N.S. Joseph
 R. L. de Krester
 B. R. Heyn
 B. W. Bawa
 P.B. Bulankulama
 Eran Wickramaratne
 Ranjan Madugalle 
 Gamini Goonesena 
 Churchill Gunasekara
 Fredrick C. de Saram
 Satyendra Coomaraswamy
 Donald Rutnam
 Basil Gunasekara
 Muhammad Ajward Macan Markar
 Asantha De Mel
 Sudath Pasqual
 Jayantha Amerasinghe 
 Rohan Jayasekera
 Roshan Jurangpathy 
 Jehan Mubarak 
 Pradeep Jayaprakashdaran
 Kithruwan Vithanage 
 Kushal Janith Perera
 Bhanuka Rajapaksa  
 Lasith Embuldeniya 
 

Thomians
D. S. Senanayake 
Dudley Senanayake
Vernon Prins
Michael Tissera
Anura Tennekoon
Buddy Reid
Mano Ponniah
Bradman Weerakoon
Duleep Mendis
Guy de Alwis
Aruna Gunawardene 
Saliya Ahangama
Kaushik Amalean 
Kapila Wijegunawardene 
Johanne Samarasekera
Nisal Fernando
Jeewan Mendis
Kaushal Silva
Stanley Tambiah
S. Saravanamuttu
P. Saravanamuttu
M. Saravanamuttu
Mevan Pieris
Ranil Abeynaike
Shantha Kottegoda
Michael Jayasekera
A. F. Molamure

See also
Royal-Thomian rivalry
Royal Thomian Regatta

References

External links
Official Royal Thomian Website
Multimedia coverage
Open Forum
The Royal–Thomian – 130 years on: The Battle of the Blues Steeped in tradition

Big Matches
Royal College, Colombo
S. Thomas' College, Mount Lavinia
Sri Lankan cricket in the 19th century
Sri Lankan cricket in the 20th century
Sri Lankan cricket in the 21st century
Student sport in Sri Lanka